Sunday Damilare Adetunji (born 10 December 1997) is a Nigerian professional footballer who plays as a center-forward for Macedonian club Shkupi

Club career 
On 1 January 2017, Adetunji signed with home side club Abia Warriors.

On 26 July 2018, Adetunji moved to Enyimba.

On 5 January 2019, Adetunji signed with Nigerian club Lobi Stars.

On 9 September 2019, Adetunji transferred to Czech club 1. FK Pribram first playing for their reserves 1. FK Pribram B, appearing six times scoring twice before going on to play for the first team with just one appearance.

On 15 January 2020, Adetunji returned to former club Lobi Stars on free transfer.

On 1 July 2020, Adetunji moved to Plateau United on free transfer.

On 17 August 2020, Adetunji returned to former club Abia Warriors.

On 1 April 2021, Adetunji transferred to Rivers United on free transfer.

KF Shkupi
On 27 August 2021, Adetunji signed with Macedonian club KF Shkupi. On 28 August 2021, Adetunji made his debut and scored a brace in a 4–1 win against FK Skopje. Adetunji finished the season as the top scorer in the league with 20 goals, helping Shkupi to their first league title.

International career 
On 4 July 2021, Adetunji made his first appearance for Nigeria coming on as a sub in the 58th minute of a 4–0 loss against Mexico in an international friendly game.

Career statistics

References

External links 
•

Living people
1997 births
Sportspeople from Lagos
Association football forwards
Nigerian footballers
Nigeria international footballers
Abia Warriors F.C. players
Enyimba F.C. players
Lobi Stars F.C. players
1. FK Příbram players
Plateau United F.C. players
Rivers United F.C. players
FK Shkupi players
Czech First League players
Nigeria Professional Football League players
Macedonian First Football League players
Nigerian expatriate footballers
Expatriate footballers in North Macedonia
Nigerian expatriate sportspeople in North Macedonia
Expatriate footballers in the Czech Republic
Nigerian expatriate sportspeople in the Czech Republic